So This Is Harris! is a 1933 American pre-Code short comedy film directed by Mark Sandrich. It won an Oscar in 1934 for Best Short Subject (Comedy). The Academy Film Archive preserved So This Is Harris! in 2012.

Plot
The film is a series of comical musical numbers and skits following Phil Harris around, starting with him performing at the Cocoanut Grove nightclub, which is listened to by Dorothy on the radio whose homebrewing husband Walter hates Harris. The action then moves to the country club where Walter unknowingly encounters Harris while being aggravated by his music. Walter then pretends to be Phil to meet a woman while Harris "entertains" her friend, Dorothy.

Cast
 Phil Harris as himself
 Walter Catlett as himself
 Helen Collins as Dorothy
 June Brewster as Lillian
 James Finlayson as Golf Pro

References

External links
 
 

1933 musical comedy films
1933 short films
1933 films
1930s English-language films
American black-and-white films
American musical comedy films
American comedy short films
Films directed by Mark Sandrich
Live Action Short Film Academy Award winners
RKO Pictures short films
1930s American films